Pentatonix is the fourth studio album by American a cappella group Pentatonix, which was released on October 16, 2015.

The release date was announced on Twitter by a series of pictures featuring the five band members released over a five-day-span, with one band member added to the picture each day, culminating in the date being revealed on August 28. It is the group's seventh release overall in their discography.

This is the first release of the band to feature predominantly original material (the only covers being the cover of Shai's "If I Ever Fall in Love" and the bonus tracks on the deluxe version of the album). Pentatonix also marks the first time band members receive individual songwriting credits for the majority of the tracks.

Pentatonix debuted atop the US Billboard 200 chart with 98,000 album-equivalent units, with the album being their first No. 1 album on the chart.

Critical reception
The album received mostly positive reviews from critics. Matt Collar of AllMusic wrote, "Ultimately, by moving away from cover tunes, Pentatonix have helped push the a cappella style even further into the pop spotlight. That the only instruments they've used to do it are their voices makes their achievement all the more impressive."

In an online review, Brittany Spanos of Rolling Stone gave the album a 2.5 out of 5 star review, criticizing the lyrics and saying that the album "lacks any oomph to go with their well-honed chops."

Commercial performance
The album debuted at number 8 in New Zealand and number 1 on the US Billboard 200. In the US, the album started with 98,000 album-equivalent units (88,000 in pure album sales).

Track listing

Personnel 
 Pentatonix

 Scott Hoying – baritone lead and backing vocals
 Mitch Grassi – tenor lead and backing vocals
 Kirstin Maldonado – alto lead and backing vocals
 Avi Kaplan – vocal bass, bass lead and backing vocals
 Kevin Olusola – vocal percussion, beatboxing, backing vocals, rapping

 Additional personnel
 Pentatonix, Thaddus "Kuk" Harrell, Martin Johnson, Ed Boyer, Drew Pearson, Ben Bram – production
 Jason Derulo – vocals on "If I Ever Fall in Love"
 Tink – vocals on "Can't Sleep Love" 
 Members of A Cappella Academy Retreat as background vocals on "Misbehavin'", "New Year's Day", and "To the River"
 Members of recording studio as background vocals on "Lean On"

Charts

Weekly charts

Year-end charts

Certifications

References

2015 albums
RCA Records albums
Pentatonix albums